

History 

 September 1, 1945 - School founded by Dr Kim Yeon-jun (1st Principal) as Hanyang Industrial Middle School    
 June 14, 1961 - Kim Young-jae appointed 2nd  Principal
 April 28, 1986 - Yeom Sing-bin appointed 3rd Principal
 September 1, 1989 - Baek Nam-gun appointed 4th Principal
 February 2, 2002 - Lee Jong-geuk appointed 5th Principal
 March 2, 2003 - Kang Moon-seok appointed 6th Principal
 May 20, 2005 - 60th anniversary of the school's founding
 March 4, 2013 - Chae Sung-bum appointed 7th Principal
 April 25, 2014 - 40th Anniversary of the twinning relationship between Hanyang and Jiben Academy (Japan)
 December 31, 2018 - Hanyang receives a commendation  from the Seoul Metropolitan Office of Education for promotion of student voluntary activities
 October 25, 2019 - Seoul Central Police Station awards Hanyang as best School Violence Prevention program
 March 2, 2021 - Kim Kwan-hoon appointed 8th Principal

Divisions 

 Smart Construction Information  
 Digital Architecture
 Smart Convergence Machinery
 Digital Electronics
 Automotive
 Computer Networking

Extra-Curricular Activities and Clubs 

 Football 
 Brass Band
 Broadcasting Station
 Climbing
 Red Cross Youth
 Dance Club ("Against")
 Student Newspaper
 Mindgear (Traditional Counselling Club)
 Start-up Club
 After-school education classes

Notable alumni 

 Kim Hyun-joong (Singer/Actor)
 Lee Hae-bum (Firefighter)
 Lee Kwan-woo (Football player)
 Park Eui-jeong (Football player)
 Yoo Chun-hee (Firefighter)

External links 

  Official website

Educational institutions established in 1945
Schools in Gyeonggi Province
High schools in South Korea

References